Old Ellerby is a hamlet in the East Riding of Yorkshire, England, in an area known as Holderness.

Together with its neighbour New Ellerby it forms the civil parish of Ellerby.

In 1823 Ellerby was in the civil parish of Swine, and the Wapentake and Liberty of Holderness. Population at the time, including the then settlements of Dowthorp, Langthorp and Owbrough, was 233. Occupations included five farmers, a blacksmith, a wheelwright, a shoemaker, and the landlord of The Board public house, and a further farmer at Dowthorp.

Old Ellerby was served from 1864 to 1902 by Ellerby railway station on the Hull and Hornsea Railway.

References

Villages in the East Riding of Yorkshire
Holderness